Jon Goodwin may refer to:

 Jon Goodwin (canoer)
 Jon Goodwin, a winner of the British quiz show Fifteen to One

See also
Jonathan Goodwin (disambiguation)
John Goodwin (disambiguation)